Karen Russell Carroll (born February 7, 1963) is a Vermont attorney and judge who has served as a justice of the Vermont Supreme Court since April 2017.

Early life
Karen Russell Carroll was born in Newport on February 7, 1963, and raised in Proctor; her family moved around the state based on her father's assignments as a member of the Vermont State Police.  Carroll's family has been involved in law enforcement for several generations; both her grandfather and great-grandfather were chief of police in Burlington.

She is a 1981 graduate of Proctor High School, and graduated from Salve Regina University with a Bachelor of Arts and Science in Criminal Justice and English and French Literature in 1985.  She received her Juris Doctor from Vermont Law School in 1988.

Career
Carroll's experience included: deputy state’s attorney for Windham County (1988–1994); Special Assistant United States Attorney for the District of Vermont (1994–2000); and assistant state attorney general with responsibility for prosecutions related to the Southern Vermont Drug Task Force (1994–2000).

From December 2000 to April 2017, Carroll was a judge of the Vermont Superior Court.  She presided over Family, Criminal and Civil Divisions in Windham, Windsor, and Bennington Counties, and was the first presiding judge of Vermont’s first DUI Treatment Court, which is in Windsor County.  She has also been an instructor at the Vermont Police Academy and she has taught Criminal Procedure and Criminal Law at the Community College of Vermont.

Family
Carroll is a resident of Vernon.  She is married to Richard C. Carroll, who is a partner in a Brattleboro law firm.  They are the parents of three children.

References

Sources

Internet

Newspapers

External links

1963 births
Living people
People from Newport (city), Vermont
People from Vernon, Vermont
Salve Regina University alumni
Vermont Law and Graduate School alumni
Vermont lawyers
Vermont state court judges
Justices of the Vermont Supreme Court
American women lawyers
21st-century American judges
Assistant United States Attorneys
21st-century American women judges